USS Volador has been the name of two ships in the service of the United States Navy.

 , a wooden-hulled schooner with an auxiliary engine
 , a Tench-class submarine

United States Navy ship names